This is a list of aircraft at the Central Air Force Museum in Moscow, Russia.

List of aircraft 

 Aero L-29 390418
 Antonov An-8 9340504
 Antonov An-10A CCCP-11213
 Antonov An-12 8900203
 Antonov An-14
 Antonov An-22 00340209
 Antonov An-24 47300903
 Bartini Beriev VVA-14
 Bell P-63 Kingcobra
 Bereznyak-Isayev BI-1 – replica
 Beriev Be-12 5600302
 Beriev Be-32 CCCP-67209
 Douglas A-20G Havoc 43-10052
 Ilyushin DB-3 891311
 Ilyushin Il-2 301060
 Ilyushin Il-10M
 Ilyushin Il-12 30218
 Ilyushin Il-18 181002702
 Ilyushin Il-28 53005771
 Ilyushin Il-62 CCCP-86670
 Ilyushin Il-76M CCCP-86047
 Kamov Ka-25 5910203
 Lavochkin La-7
 Lavochkin La-15
 Lavochkin La-250 1250004
 Lisunov Li-2 18418809
 Lisunov Li-2 CCCP-93914
 Mikoyan-Gurevich MiG-9
 Mikoyan-Gurevich MiG-17F
 Mikoyan-Gurevich MiG-19P 62210104
 Mikoyan-Gurevich MiG-21bis N75021148
 Mikoyan-Gurevich MiG-21I N010103
 Mikoyan-Gurevich MiG-21PFS N95210102
 Mikoyan-Gurevich MiG-23
 Mikoyan-Gurevich MiG-25PD
 Mikoyan-Gurevich MiG-25R
 Mikoyan-Gurevich MiG-29 0390502020
 Mikoyan-Gurevich MiG-29 2960710039
 Mikoyan-Gurevich MiG-29 2960718121
 Mikoyan-Gurevich MiG-31 N69700102176
 Mikoyan-Gurevich MiG-31 N69700106125
 Mikoyan-Gurevich MiG-105
 Mil Mi-1
 Mil Mi-2 528230063
 Mil Mi-4 1104
 Mil Mi-6VKP
 Mil Mi-6 966839018
 Mil Mi-6
 Mil Mi-8 00604
 Mil Mi-8T 9743470
 Mil Mi-10 8680604K
 Mil Mi-12
 Mil Mi-24A 2201201
 Mil Mi-24V 3532424015897
 Mil Mi-26 34001212102
 Myasishchev 3M
 Myasishchev M-17
 Myasishchev M-50
 North American B-25 Mitchell
 Piasecki Model 44
 Polikarpov Po-2
 Polikarpov R-5
 PZL M-15 Belphegor
 Sukhoi Su-2 – replica
 Sukhoi Su-7B
 Sukhoi Su-9
 Sukhoi Su-11
 Sukhoi Su-15
 Sukhoi Su-17 9024
 Sukhoi Su-17M3 22301
 Sukhoi Su-17M4
 Sukhoi Su-17UM3 63002
 Sukhoi Su-24 0515304
 Sukhoi Su-25
 Sukhoi Su-27
 Sukhoi T-4
 Tupolev ANT-25 – replica
 Tupolev Tu-2
 Tupolev Tu-4 280503
 Tupolev Tu-16K 4201004
 Tupolev Tu-16R 1880302
 Tupolev Tu-22
 Tupolev Tu-22M
 Tupolev Tu-95
 Tupolev Tu-104
 Tupolev Tu-128
 Tupolev Tu-144 CCCP-77106
 Yakovlev Yak-9U 0257
 Yakovlev Yak-11
 Yakovlev Yak-12R
 Yakovlev Yak-17
 Yakovlev Yak-18
 Yakovlev Yak-18
 Yakovlev Yak-18PM
 Yakovlev Yak-18T
 Yakovlev Yak-23
 Yakovlev Yak-24 27203310
 Yakovlev Yak-25
 Yakovlev Yak-25RV
 Yakovlev Yak-27R 0703
 Yakovlev Yak-28L
 Yakovlev Yak-36
 Yakovlev Yak-38
 Yakovlev Yak-40 CCCP-87490
 Yakovlev Yak-42 CCCP-42302
 Yakovlev Yak-50
 Yakovlev Yak-52 780102
 Yakovlev Yak-141

References

External links 

 Official website
Guide for foreign visitors and virtual tour
Information and photos of the museum
 Virtual tour
Photos Russian Air Force museum Monino – Comtourist
Monino, Central Air Force Museum – Ruudleeuw.com
Monino Aircraft Museum, Moscow, Russia – Silicon Valley Scale Modelers
Monino Museum Moscow
Russian Air Force Museum at Monino – The Flying Kiwi
Cold War Air Power - Soviet Aircraft: Part A: Monino Central VVS Museum Fighter and Attack Aircraft – Air Power Australia
Monino Inventory – Anhedral Aviation
Russian Federation Air Force Museum – Vintage Aviation Pictures

Central Air Force Museum